COC No. 41 - Malangas or the Malangas Coal Reservation is a Coal Reservation in Zamboanga Sibugay, Philippines exploited by the Philippine National Oil Company - Exploration Corporation (PNOC-EC). 

PNOC EC operates Coal Operating Contract (COC) 41 within the Malangas Coal Reservation in Zamboanga Sibugay, straddling portions of the municipalities of Malangas, Diplahan, and Imelda. PNOC EC operates a large-scale coal mine known as the Integrated Little Baguio (ILB) colliery, which is currently the largest semi-mechanized underground coal mine in the country. As holder of the COC, the company also supervises the mining operations of various small-scale coal miners.

The decrease in coal production from the 2007 output can be attributed to the major repair and rehabilitation activities that were undertaken at the ILB colliery.

Also in 2008, the Phase 1 exploration drilling contract was awarded and a Certificate of Non Coverage was obtained for the Lumbog area. Equipment mobilization, site preparation, drilling and core logging, as well as sampling and laboratory analysis were also completed. Studies on mine feasibility and detailed engineering and design were also started during the year.

PNOC EC also conducted geological investigation, drilling and reserve evaluation in the Shaft 3 area. For the Malongon area, the Company completed reconnaissance mapping, map preparation and preliminary assessment. Data on geology and coal resources were updated, and preliminary exploration activities were started.

See also
 Malangas, Zamboanga Sibugay

External links
 Philippine Standard Geographic Code
 2000 Philippine Census Information
 

Coal in the Philippines
Coal mines in the Philippines
Geography of Zamboanga Sibugay